Ascension is a 2014 science fiction mystery drama television miniseries which aired on CBC in Canada and Syfy in the United States. It consisted of six 43 minute episodes, grouped into three chapters of two episodes each. The show was created by Philip Levens and Adrian A. Cruz. The pilot was written and executive produced by Philip Levens, who served as the showrunner.

On July 9, 2014, CBC added Ascension to its fall programming roster. It had originally been scheduled to premiere in November 2014.

In October 2014, CBC announced that the premiere date had been moved to January 2015.

The show started airing on CBC on Monday nights starting February 9, 2015. Syfy had originally announced plans to debut the show on November 24, 2014, airing one episode per week for six weeks. Instead, the series premiered on December 15, 2014, airing one chapter consisting of two episodes each night for three consecutive nights.

The story takes place aboard a generation ship launched in the 1960s and now half-way into its 100-year journey to Proxima Centauri. A murder on board sparks off a series of events that leads some of the crew to begin second-guessing their real mission.

Plot
The premise of the show is that in 1963 President John F. Kennedy and the U.S. government, fearing the Cold War will escalate and lead to the destruction of Earth, launched the Ascension, an Orion-class spaceship, to colonize a planet orbiting Proxima Centauri, assuring the survival of the human race.

The USS Ascension is a massive, self-sustaining generation ship. The journey will take 100 years, so only the children and grandchildren of the original crew of 600 volunteers will be alive when they arrive.

The story begins 51 years into their journey (i.e., in the present), as they approach the point of no return (when the ship would flip and begin the deceleration to their final destination, after which time they would have insufficient fuel to initiate a return trip). The action begins with the mysterious murder of a young woman – the first homicide since the Ascension was launched.

The investigation causes some of the ship's crew to question the true nature of their mission.

Cast and characters

Main cast
 Tricia Helfer as Viondra Denninger, a beautiful, manipulative and dangerous power broker on the Ascension. As the Captain's wife, Viondra is afforded a position of power and privilege, which she leverages as the ship's Chief Stewardess.
 Gil Bellows as Harris Enzmann, son of Abraham Enzmann, the founder of the Ascension mission, who is determined to continue his father's work back on Earth.
 Brian Van Holt as Captain William Denninger, Commanding Officer, who is married to Viondra. While his professional life appears solid, William's marriage to Viondra is anything but.
 Andrea Roth as Dr. Juliet Bryce, Chief Medical Officer of the Ascension.
 Brandon P. Bell as Executive Officer Aaron Gault, professional, confident, and capable, born to maintenance workers on the ship's lower decks.  He must investigate the aforementioned murder.
 Ellie O'Brien as Christa Valis, a child with extraordinary abilities.
 Jacqueline Byers as Nora Bryce, Juliet's daughter, a young woman who is under intense familial pressure to follow her mother by apprenticing at the medical center but instead finds herself drawn to the Terraforming Department and the promise of building a new world.
 Tiffany Lonsdale as Chief Astronomer Emily Vanderhaus, the older sister of the murder victim, whose rocky marriage to Safety Officer Duke Vanderhaus will be put to the test by this family tragedy.
 P.J. Boudousqué as James Toback, one of the ship's maintenance workers and Nora's love interest.

Supporting cast

 Mark Camacho as Martin Carillo
 Brad Carter as Stockyard Master John Stokes.
 Wendy Crewson as Director Katherine Warren
 Lauren Lee Smith as Samantha Krueger, an investigator on Earth.
 Spiro Malandrakis as Nixon
 Robert Naylor as Matthew
 John Ralston as Dr. Robert Bryce
 Ryan Robbins as Chief Safety Officer Duke Vanderhaus, who is married to Emily Vanderhaus.
 Al Sapienza as Councilman Rose
 Jessica Sipos as Jackie North, a stewardess who has begun sleeping with the Captain.
 Amanda Thomson as Lorelei Wright, the murder victim.
 Elias Toufexis as Mark Hayes
 Cynthia Preston as Laura Enzmann
 Hannah Saunders as Alison
 Lauren Suthers as a student
 Sylvia Stewart as Young Gault's Mother

Episodes

Development and production
On March 13, 2014, came the official announcement that Syfy had ordered Ascension as a six-part miniseries. Syfy billed Ascension as a "6-hour event series".

Producers and studios
Ascension is an original sci-fi mystery drama created and written by Philip Levens who serves as executive producer and showrunner. The series is produced in Montreal, Quebec, Canada, by Canada-based Sea to Sky Studios in association with U.S.-based Blumhouse Productions. It is co-financed and distributed by U.S.-based Universal Cable Productions and Canada-based Lionsgate Television.

Jason Blum and Mark Stern are executive producers on the project along with Ivan Fecan, Tim Gamble, and Brett Burlock.

Casting
On April 30, 2014, Syfy announced that Tricia Helfer would star as Viondra Denninger. On June 3, 2014, Brian Van Holt was announced to star as Captain William Denninger.

On June 24, 2014, Brandon P. Bell, Tiffany Lonsdale, and Jacqueline Byers were announced to co-star alongside Helfer and Van Holt, as First Officer Oren Gault, Chief Astronomer Emily Vanderhaus, and Nora Bryce respectively, and two days later, Andrea Roth and P.J. Boudousque joined the main cast as Dr. Juliet Bryce and James Toback respectively.

On July 7, 2014, Ryan Robbins joined the main cast as Safety Officer Duke Vanderhaus, and two days later, Gil Bellows joined the main cast as Harris Enzmann. Later the same day, Wendy Crewson was announced to guest star in an as yet unspecified role (which was ultimately that of Director Katherine Warren).

Filming
The series began shooting on July 7, 2014, in Montreal. Canadian director Stephen Williams directed the first two episodes.

Promotion
The first promotional teaser-trailer was released on May 15, 2014, at the 2014 NBCUniversal Cable Upfront Presentation. The trailer is available for viewing on the official page of Ascension on Syfy's website.

On July 14, 2014, executive producer and showrunner Phil Levens and executive producer Jason Blum appeared at the Television Critics Association (TCA) summer press tour to talk about the new series bringing along the principal stars of the show, Brian Van Holt and Tricia Helfer, to field questions from the ballroom of critics. (see below: Comments by the cast and crew)

On October 13, 2014, the network announced that instead of airing as a weekly series for six weeks, Ascension would air as a three-night "event" starting on December 15, 2014, with two of the six episodes airing each of three consecutive nights.

Potential future seasons
Although the show was ordered as a miniseries, it could have continued, similar to the network's popular series Battlestar Galactica. On March 10, 2015, Syfy announced that they would not be producing more episodes, "We were very happy with Ascension as an event series, but with so much high profile development in the works, we have decided not to pursue a full series".

Comments by the cast and crew

Upon the official announcement, on March 13, 2014, that Syfy had picked up the miniseries, Bill McGoldrick, Executive Vice President of Original Content for Syfy stated: "Phil Levens has crafted a bold and surprising spin on the space opera. We are equally excited to embark on this journey with our partners at UCP, Sea to Sky, Lionsgate, Jason Blum and his Blumhouse Productions and also with Mark Stern who shepherded this project while at Syfy".

On July 14, 2014, at the Television Critics Association summer press tour, Jason Blum, Tricia Helfer, Philip Levens, and Brian Van Holt commented on the upcoming show.

Executive producer Jason Blum said that:

What piqued [his] interest was the originality of EP Philip Levens' story idea, which was inspired by Freeman Dyson's Project Orion to design a nuclear-propelled spacecraft. Levens pointed out that President Kennedy squashed the development of Orion soon after the Bay of Pigs as the military began equipping the spaceship with weapons. He was terrified that they were turning it into a Death Star.

About the starship he said that "it feels like a cruise ship. Essentially the ship is like a time capsule, another civilization that continued for 50 years parallel to our civilization." Blum added that:

The people on the ship, only some of their children, but most of their grandchildren, are the only people who are going to arrive at this new world. A lot of the people who started on this ship have died. It's their children, their children's children, who are going to get to where they're going. And there are a lot of conflicts going on. Should they turn around and go back to Earth, which they've lost touch with? So they have no idea of what Earth even looks like now. Should they continue? Also there's been a murder on the ship, which never happened before. So that's kind of what starts it.

Tricia Helfer said about Viondra that her "manipulative" character considers herself the "mother of the people on the ship, the mother of humanity in one way if Earth did blow itself up". "Brian [Van Holt] and I play a married couple and as the wife, I'm definitely the woman behind the man more than we would see in our society here on Earth today", Helfer added. She explained about the ship's crew that:

Their morals and the values that they're dealing with are still from the '60s. The society on the ship is very hierarchical and uses genetic linking-arranged marriages, basically to sustain human life (three generations will be born during the trip to Proxima). [My] character Viondra started out on the lower decks but rose through the ranks, as did her husband. They're a power couple. Viondra will do anything to stay in power.

Creator Philip Levens said that:

Ascension will explore how technology has evolved on the ship and the way morality is still rooted in an early '60s, pre-Civil Rights Act view [of] humanity. Issues of class – the ship is divided into decks, with people in positions of power living on the upper ones – will also come into play. There's much more of a sense of obeying your parents because, you know, for the ship to really work, everybody has to cooperate. The murder is kind of the starting of the unravelling, so to speak. And kids start to question choices made by their grandparents. There's a thing on board the ship called "the crisis". It's this existential dilemma that everyone has to go through when they realize that, you know, their life has been circumscribed for them. You know, everybody they ever know or ever will know is already around them. So there's lots of issues like that kind of play [as] a coming of age thing with the kids and their parents.

Because the series is set on a ship that is self-contained and self-sustained, the people have evolved and developed differently than they would have if they'd remained on Earth. Not only is the technology different, but they think differently, too

Brian Van Holt described his character as "a man caught in the middle, aware that his legacy as the ship's 'middle route' captain won't probably go down in the record books. The one who launches the ship and the one who lands it will be remembered. No one in the now will be remembered. So he struggles with that". He concluded by saying that "he's a very ambitious character who sought out a leadership role, which was presented to him after an act of heroism on the ship".

Reception
Ascension met with mixed reviews from critics. Rotten Tomatoes gives the show a rating of 65%, based on 20 reviews, with an average rating of 5.8/10. The site's critical consensus states, "The characters in Ascension lack the depth necessary for its dramatic elements, but its premise may be smart enough to hold the interest of sci-fi fans." On Metacritic, the show has a score of 56 out of 100, based on reviews from 14 critics, indicating "mixed or average reviews".

See also 
 Orbiter 9

References

External links
  on Syfy
 

American adventure television series
2010s American science fiction television series
2010s American television miniseries
Canadian adventure television series
2010s Canadian science fiction television series
2010s Canadian television miniseries
English-language television shows
Space adventure television series
Fiction about outer space
Films shot in Minnesota
Films shot in Montreal
Retrofuturism
Space opera television series
Syfy original programming
Television shows filmed in Montreal
Television shows set in Minnesota
Television series by Lionsgate Television
Television series by Universal Content Productions
2014 American television series debuts
2014 American television series endings
2014 Canadian television series debuts
2014 Canadian television series endings
Generation ships in fiction
Fiction set around Proxima Centauri